Pierrick Berteloot (born 11 January 1999 in Dunkirk) is a French politician of the National Rally. He was elected as a deputy in the National Assembly for Nord's 15th constituency in 2022.

Biography
Berteloot was born and raised in Dunkirk. He is the great-grandson of French resistance fighter Louis Maniez who was executed by Nazi forces in 1944 and has a bridge named after him in Bourbourg. After secondary school, Berteloot became a sailor based in various countries including the United States and attended the L'Ecole Maritime de Boulogne maritime academy in Boulogne-sur-Mer. He was then an employee of a ferry company operating between France and England.

In 2020, he was elected as a municipal councilor in Bourbourg for the National Rally and became a delegate for overseeing military and patriotic ceremonies in this capacity. In 2021, he became a regional councilor in Hauts-de-France on a list headed by Sébastien Chenu.

For the 2022 French legislative election, Berteloot contested the constituency of Nord's 15th. He won the seat in the second round, defeating EELV and NUPES affiliated candidate Emilie Ducourant.

Berteloot is openly gay and in interviews ahead of the legislative election stated that his experiences with homophobic bullying in school shaped his decision to get involved in politics.

References 

1991 births
Living people
People from Dunkirk
Politicians from Hauts-de-France
Deputies of the 16th National Assembly of the French Fifth Republic
Members of the Regional Council of Hauts-de-France
LGBT legislators in France
LGBT conservatism
National Rally (France) politicians
Gay politicians
French sailors